Albufeira Bullring is a bullring (Portuguese: Praça de Touros) in Albufeira, Portugal. Bullfighting, horse shows, and concerts were held in the arena until 2019. In 2021 it was sold with plans to no longer hold bullfights but to renovate the structure. This was following a failed attempt by the PAN group in 2020 to purchase the arena.

References

Buildings and structures in Albufeira
Bullrings in Portugal
Sport in Albufeira
Sports venues completed in 1982
Modernist architecture in Portugal